R.O.B. (Robotic Operating Buddy) is a toy robot accessory for the Nintendo Entertainment System (NES). Its short lifespan yielded only two games in the Robot Series: Gyromite and Stack-Up.

Following the video game crash of 1983, Nintendo alleviated the fearful retail market by rebranding its Japanese Famicom video game console as the Nintendo Entertainment System—a new platform focused on R.O.B. to further reclassify the system as a uniquely sophisticated toy experience instead of simply as a video game console. Computer Entertainer magazine in June 1985 called R.O.B. "the world's only interactive robot".

The NES's extensive marketing plan, with its immediately successful centering on R.O.B., began with the October 1985 test market launch of the NES in Manhattan, New York. The launch was Nintendo's debut in the North American video game console market, which eventually revitalized the entire video game industry. R.O.B. was quietly discontinued a few years later, and is now remembered as a successful Trojan Horse of marketing. He is a cameo or playable character in many Nintendo games, most notably the Super Smash Bros. series.

History

Development

The new Nintendo of America subsidiary, having already bet the company's own launch upon its conversion of its failed Radar Scope (1980) arcade game cabinets into the successful new Donkey Kong (1981) arcade game, wanted to debut in the home video game console market using the Japanese parent company's successful Famicom system. But the entire video game industry, which had been virtually abandoned following the devastating video game crash of 1983, first needed a relaunch.

Following the crash, many retailers had lost confidence in the Atari-led video game market even while the toy market was strong. With a high volume of low quality products and dead-inventory shovelware, some retailers and industry critics considered video gaming to be a passing fad altogether. Therefore, Nintendo spent much of 1984 re-conceiving its Family Computer (Famicom) brand from Japan to be portrayed to America not as a traditional video game console, but as a new kind of sophisticated entertainment experience altogether.

Nintendo saw the industry's overwhelming trend away from game consoles and toward home computers, but its prototype of a lavish Famicom-based home computer and multimedia package called Advanced Video System (AVS) was poorly received at the January 1985 Winter Consumer Electronics Show, so that system was canceled and redesigned into a cost-reduced toy motif. The Famicom's whimsical appearance was again rebranded with a serious naming and industrial design language similar to the AVS, called the Nintendo Entertainment System (NES). The NES is based on a "control deck", shaped like high-tech videophile equipment with a front-loaded and door-enclosed cartridge port in the style of the modern VCR instead of a top-loaded "video game console".

The Family Computer Robot, a recent niche entry in the Famicom's aftermarket accessory lineup in Japan on July 26, 1985, is a mechanized toy robot with working arms and crude eyesight, resembling "a cross between E.T. and R2-D2". It was designed and patented by veteran Nintendo designer Gunpei Yokoi. Used as a functional companion for playing select video games within a custom playset, it was recolored for the NES and was thrust forth as essential to the NES's new identity as a futuristic, robot-powered experience. The Milwaukee Journal said, "The key to the NES is the interactive robot ... You no longer have to fight only the aliens on the screen; you have a robot to contend with as well." Computer Entertainer called it "the world's only interactive robot", as no other video game system or home computer package ever had one, greatly distinguishing the NES to retailers and consumers alike.

Receiving the first R.O.B. shipment from Japan, Nintendo of America staff remembered their first impression of unboxing and using the robot, initially thrilled with anticipation. Howard Phillips said, "The technology was so cool! ... like voodoo magic ... But then his actual motion was just hysterically slow." Nintendo marketing executive Gail Tilden said "That thing was definitely like watching grass grow. It was so slow, and to try and stand there and sales-pitch it in person and try to make it exciting; you had to have the eyes lined up just right or it wouldn't receive the flashes. It was kind of a challenge." Product designer Don James laughed, "[Gyromite] was hard as hell! ... So you really had to think two or three moves ahead to allow him to do what he was going to do. But it's cool to look at, right? ... It was a really neat, unusual little device. And it was fun to play! But again, like Rock 'em Sock 'em Robots, I wouldn't want to do it for 40 hours." Tasked with all of the NES's naming and branding, the sole marketing staff member Gail Tilden said the name was "originally going to be OTTO, which was a play on the word 'auto'", but she settled on Robotic Operating Buddy, or R.O.B.

As the centerpiece of the new NES platform, R.O.B.'s first presentation came at the Summer Consumer Electronics Show in Chicago in June 1985. Nintendo's brochure for attracting distributors shows a prototypical hybrid between AVS and NES with R.O.B., saying, "The future of home entertainment is staring you in the face. Our new video robot is the first of a long line of winners to come from Nintendo." and that R.O.B. is the "star of a new Entertainment System that's programmed to make you rich". The robotic persona reportedly "worked like a charm" to drive intrigued visitors to Nintendo's booth, but nobody signed up to be a distributor of the upcoming NES.

IGN reflected that "[R.O.B.] might have been the key to getting the system into players' hands, and once they had players, Nintendo was convinced the rest would be easy."

Release
Nintendo anticipated that R.O.B.'s flair for futurism, personality, and physicality was to be so crucial to the success of the NES, that the toy was featured prominently in much of the advertising media of the system and its game library, even more than any particular game. The robot was portrayed as a bridge between the player and the game. The retail floor displays were each topped with a huge R.O.B. head model, and the launch party centered on a colossal robot replica with many small silver-plated robot models. The toy robot is the highlighted accessory within the first and most premium NES consumer product offering, the Deluxe Set. This is a boxed bundle containing a Control Deck, R.O.B., Zapper light gun, Gyromite, and Duck Hunt.

The NES was launched in the Deluxe Set at its October 1985 test market in New York City, then in further test markets including Los Angeles, Chicago, and San Francisco, and finally nationwide. The NES's design language with R.O.B. and the Zapper, recategorized the retailers' perception of the NES from a video game to a toy. This bypassed the crashed video game stigma and launched it more safely from the toy sections of retail stores next to established hit robot toys like Transformers, Voltron, Go-Bots, Teddy Ruxpin, and Lazer Tag.

Soon in 1985 came the second and final entry in the Robot Series, Stack-Up, packaged separately along with its own physical game pieces. In the following few years, R.O.B. and the two-game Robot Series were quietly discontinued altogether.

Hardware

The patent underlying the R.O.B. product was filed by Gunpei Yokoi as "photosensing video game control system", with the same optical electronics as a NES Zapper, and likewise only functions correctly when coupled with a cathode ray tube (CRT) television and not an LCD. Games can send six distinct commands to R.O.B. by flashing the screen. Both Gyromite and Stack-Up include a test feature, sending an optical flash that should make R.O.B.'s LED light up.

The R.O.B. unit's height is 24 cm (9.6 in). It has a head movement range of a 45° horizontally centered tilt. The arm movement range is 240° left and right with five stopping points, 7 cm (2.75 in) up and down with six stopping points, and 7 cm (2.75 in) between hands when open. The unit has five accessory slots around the hexagonal base, numbered clockwise, starting at the rear-left from the robot's point of view; and notches on the hands allow for specialized parts to be attached for each game. The tinted filter can be optionally attached over the eyes like sunglasses, to compensate for bright televisions or sunlight. The unit is powered by four AA batteries.

Games
Only two officially licensed games were published for R.O.B., which comprise Nintendo's Robot Series: Gyromite and Stack-Up. Computer Entertainer reported Nintendo's supposed plans as stated prior to CES June 1985, for four more nondescript Robot Series games, but they were never released.

Gyromite
The Gyromite retail package consists of the following items: two claws for R.O.B.'s hands; two heavy spinning tops called "gyros"; two red and blue trays upon which the gyros will rest, causing buttons to be pressed on the second NES controller; one spinner motor for accelerating the gyros; and two black trays upon which the gyros are placed when not in use. The Direct game mode is a feature used to learn how to use R.O.B. or to play with R.O.B. without playing the game. Gyromite is a puzzle-platformer in which Professor Hector, the main character of the game, has to collect dynamite before the time runs out, with several red and blue pillars, along with dinosaur-like creatures called "Smicks", blocking his way. Hector cannot jump, so the only way to collect the dynamite is for him to descend upon them. He can also collect radishes that attract the Smicks when dropped. In Game A, the commands are made by pressing START and then pushing the direction in which to move R.O.B., and using the A and B buttons to open and close his arms. If R.O.B. places a gyro on the red or blue button, it pushes the A or B button on the second NES controller, moving the pillar of the corresponding color. If both buttons need to be pressed at the same time, the gyros are placed in a spinner so that they will stay balanced on the button without R.O.B. holding it. Game B has the same controls, except that START does not need to be pressed to make R.O.B. accept a command.

Stack-Up
Stack-Up comes with five trays, five different colored circular blocks, and two claws worn by R.O.B. for grabbing the blocks. Again, the player controls Professor Hector. In the Direct game mode, the player makes their block stack match with the one shown on screen by moving Hector to the button that corresponds to the desired movement. In Memory, the player has to make a list of commands to recreate the displayed block setup, and then R.O.B. follows the list afterward. In Bingo, the player makes the shown block stack, where the color of the block does not matter. There are two enemies: one causes the player to lose a life, and the other makes R.O.B. perform undesired actions.

Aftermarket
In 2014, independent game developer Retrozone produced a limited release NES cartridge titled 8-Bit X-Mas 2014. The title screen features R.O.B. character graphics, and interacts with the toy by making it dance to Christmas music.

Reception

In January 1986, an independent research firm commissioned by Nintendo delivered a survey of 200 NES owners, showing that the most popular given reason for buying an NES was because children wanted the robot—followed by good graphics, variety of games, and the uniqueness and newness of the NES package. The creation and marketing of R.O.B. as a "Trojan Horse" after the video game crash of 1983 was placed fifth in GameSpy's twenty-five smartest moves in gaming history. Yahoo! ranked R.O.B. as one of the craziest video game controllers and noted the unfortunate fact that the peripheral only worked with two games.

By 1987, the two-year-old R.O.B. and Robot Series had received none of Nintendo's promised updates while the rest of the NES's library had exploded with classic flagship franchise-building hits like Super Mario Bros., The Legend of Zelda, and Metroid. In 1987, Mark Seeley of Crash! magazine visited a toy fair in England to observe a playthrough of Gyromite with R.O.B., saying of the struggling demonstrator that he had "never seen anything so complicated and difficult in all my life". In July 1987, Family Computing magazine advocated buying the much cheaper and more entertaining setup of the Control Deck and Super Mario Bros. instead of R.O.B., saying, "Anyone who has seen a Nintendo ad on television would think that R.O.B. is the heart of the system. Not so. R.O.B. is an ingenious idea [but] while R.O.B. is a cute little guy, there isn't much you can do with him. ... [N]either [of his two games] generates much excitement."

In 2018, Owen S. Good of Polygon remembered his childhood experience with the vintage R.O.B. and assessed the setup as "a novel, if almost Rube Goldberg-esque way of 'playing' with its users ... that quickly got dull".

Historian Chris Kohler was unimpressed with the product's long-term entertainment value. "As video game controller peripherals go, R.O.B. was a particularly gimmicky one. Once the novelty of controlling a robot's arms and spinning a glorified top had worn off, usually within days or even hours, R.O.B. got in the way of enjoyment. He required battery replacements too often, and it was immediately apparent that the maze barriers in Gyromite could be turned on and off just as easily by tapping the A and B buttons on a standard controller, which was all that R.O.B.'s complicated motions ended up doing."

In retrospect, Kohler considered R.O.B.'s discontinuation to now be immaterial because the product's whole existence has ultimately amounted to "merely a Trojan horse to get NES systems into American homes". He said "The gambit worked like a charm, and nobody missed R.O.B. or the Zapper once players realized that games played with the standard video game controller, like Super Mario Bros. were much more fun."

Legacy
After many failures, the late addition of R.O.B. gave a key product distinction to the launch of the Nintendo Entertainment System, reclassified the platform as a toy, and served as a Trojan Horse to enable the platform's successful launch. This, in turn, secured the survival of Nintendo of America and revitalized the entire video game industry. A followup promotional poster from Nintendo simply pictured R.O.B. and said, "They said reviving the video game market wasn't humanly possible. It wasn't."

R.O.B. has made cameo appearances in many video games, such as StarTropics (1990) for NES, F-Zero GX (2003), the WarioWare series, The Legend of Zelda: Majora's Mask (2015, 3DS), and the Star Fox series.

R.O.B. is an unlockable character in Mario Kart DS, Super Smash Bros. Brawl, Super Smash Bros. for Nintendo 3DS and Wii U, and Super Smash Bros. Ultimate, each of which refers to R.O.B. as male. In Brawls adventure mode, The Subspace Emissary, R.O.B. plays a major role in the plot. As part of Super Smash Bros. for Nintendo 3DS and Wii U, R.O.B. has two Amiibo figurines, uniquely produced in both the gray and white NES color scheme and the red and white Famicom color scheme.

R.O.B. is the model for TASBot, a tool-assisted speedrun software bot for video games.

See also

 HERO, a programmable robot series for home computers from 1982 to 1995
 Topo, a programmable robot series for home computers from 1983 to 1984
 Short Circuit, the 1986 sci-fi film starring the robot Johnny Five
 WALL-E, the 2008 sci-fi film starring the titular robot
 Transformers

Notes

References

1985 robots
Fictional characters introduced in 1985
Japanese inventions
Nintendo antagonists
Nintendo characters
Nintendo Entertainment System accessories
Nintendo protagonists
Nintendo toys
Robot characters in video games
Robots of Japan
Super Smash Bros. fighters
Toy robots
Fictional martial artists
Fictional sole survivors
Video game sidekicks
Fictional racing drivers